Stanislav Sergeyevich Govorukhin (29 March 1936 – 14 June 2018) was a Soviet and Russian film director, actor, screenwriter, producer and politician. He was named People's Artist of Russia in 2006. His movies often featured detective or adventure plots.

Biography
Govorukhin was born in Berezniki, Sverdlovsk Oblast (now Perm Krai). His parents divorced before he was born. His father Sergei Georgievich Govorukhin came from Russian Don Cossacks and was arrested as part of the decossackization genocide campaign started by Yakov Sverdlov. He had been exiled to Siberia where he died around 1938 at the age of 30. His mother Praskovya Afanasievna Glazkova was a tailor. She came from the Volga region, from a simple Russian family of a village school teacher. She raised Sergei and his sister Inessa by herself and died at the age of 53.

Govorukhin started his career as a geologist in 1958. He then joined a television studio in Kazan and enrolled at the VGIK. During the Soviet period, Govorukhin became noted for his successful adaptations of adolescent classics, including Robinson Crusoe (1972), Adventures of Tom Sawyer (1981), In Search of the Castaways (1983) and Ten Little Niggers (an adaptation of Agatha Christie's original 1939 novel And Then There Were None) in 1987.

Most of his Soviet movies were made at the Odessa Film Studio. He was good friends with Vladimir Vysotsky and directed three movies starring him – Vertical (1967), White Explosion (1969) and The Meeting Place Cannot Be Changed (1979), one of the cult films of the late Soviet era. Several other of his films feature Visotsky's songs written as part of the soundtrack.

Apart from directing, he also wrote screenplays (including the top-grossing Soviet action film Pirates of the 20th Century directed by his fellow student Boris Durov in 1979) and started in movies as an actor. Being a trained mountaineer, he usually performed all the stunts himself. He also dedicated several movies to mountaineering, most notably Vertical and White Explosion which became some of the first examples of this subgenre in the Soviet cinema.

During the perestroika Govorukhin became less active at film making and more active in politics. He became one of the leaders of the Democratic Party of Russia. In 1990 he directed a much-publicized documentary highly critical of the Soviet society entitled We Can't Live Like This (also translates as You Can't Live Like That or This Is No Way to Live). Although his feature films were previously ignored by the critical establishment, this film won him the Nika Award for Best Director. It was at that time that Govorukhin released an extensive interview with Aleksandr Solzhenitsyn.

By the start of the 2000s he returned to cinema, co-starring with Alisa Freindlich in the detective TV series Female Logic and releasing another revenge movie, Voroshilov Sharpshooter (with Mikhail Ulyanov in the lead role). He directed a total of seven movies since then. In recent years he had been also actively working as a producer.

Govorukhin died on 14 June 2018 at the age of 82 following a long illness. He was buried at the Novodevichy Cemetery in Moscow.

Politics
Govorukhin had been a member of the State Duma since its inauguration in 1993, running the Duma culture committee for some time. Following the 1993 Russian constitutional crisis, he had abandoned his previous democratic anti-communist convictions and sided with the national-communist opposition. In 1996, he supported Gennady Zyuganov against Boris Yeltsin during the second round of the presidential election campaign. In 2000 he took part in Russian presidential elections.

In 2011–2012 Govorukhin worked as the head of Vladimir Putin's campaign office. At this time he was a member of party United Russia.

In June 2013, he joined the central staff of the All-Russia People's Front, led by Russian President Vladimir Putin.

In March 2014, he signed a letter in support of the position of the President of Russia Vladimir Putin on Russia's annexation of Crimea.

Personal life 
Govorukhin was married twice. He had one son from his first marriage — Sergey Govorukhin (1961–2011), a war correspondent, writer and director of documentary films who took part in different armed conflicts in Tajikistan, Yugoslavia, Afghanistan and both Chechen wars between 1994 and 2005. In 1995 he was wounded by Chechen terrorists which resulted in one of his legs being amputated. Nevertheless, he continued his work. In 1998 he released one of the most acclaimed documentaries about the First Chechen War — Damned and Forgotten that was awarded with the Nika Award in 1998 as the best documentary. He also took part in several non-governmental organizations dedicated to helping disabled war veterans. In 2011 he survived a stroke and died several days later at the age of 50. He left two sons and one daughter.

During the 1990s Stanislav Govorukhin became professionally interested in landscape painting. He conducted a number of expositions since 1998.

Govorukhin belonged to the Russian Orthodox Church. In 2016, during his 80th birthday, Patriarch Kirill of Moscow awarded him with the II class Order of Sergius of Radonezh.

Filmography

References

External links
 Stanislav Govorukhin's Official site
 Stanislav Govorukhin's Bio
 

1936 births
2018 deaths
People from Berezniki
Democratic Party of Russia politicians
United Russia politicians
First convocation members of the State Duma (Russian Federation)
Soviet film directors
Russian film directors
Russian Orthodox Christians from Russia
Govorukhin
Honorary Members of the Russian Academy of Arts
Recipients of the Nika Award
Academicians of the National Academy of Motion Picture Arts and Sciences of Russia
21st-century Russian politicians
Recipients of the Order "For Merit to the Fatherland", 1st class
Russian actor-politicians
Second convocation members of the State Duma (Russian Federation)
Third convocation members of the State Duma (Russian Federation)
Fourth convocation members of the State Duma (Russian Federation)
Fifth convocation members of the State Duma (Russian Federation)
Sixth convocation members of the State Duma (Russian Federation)
Seventh convocation members of the State Duma (Russian Federation)